John Edward Mazur (June 17, 1930 – November 1, 2013) was an American gridiron football player and coach. He was played college football as a quarterback at the University of Notre Dame. Mazur served as head coach for the New England Patriots of the National Football League (NFL) from 1970 to 1972.

Career
Mazur grew up in Plymouth, Pennsylvania where he graduated in Plymouth High School’s class of 1948. His outstanding quarterbacking skills caught the attention of Notre Dame coaches, leading him to play for the Fighting Irish from 1949 to 1951, starting for the 1951 squad that finished 7–2–1. The following year, Mazur went into the Marine Corps, playing quarterback for both the Quantico and Camp Pendleton Marines.  Upon his discharge in 1954, Mazur headed to Canada, where he spent one year with the BC Lions of the Canadian Football League before suffering a career-ending ankle injury.

In 1955, Mazur entered the coaching ranks, spending the first of three years as an assistant at Tulane University. He followed that with one year at Marquette University in 1958, before heading east to work three years in a similar capacity for Boston University.

On January 22, 1962, Mazur was hired as backfield coach of the American Football League Buffalo Bills, spending seven seasons with the team as offensive coordinator, helping them capture AFL titles in both 1964 and 1965. By his final year with Buffalo in 1968, Mazur had seen the team collapse with the worst record in professional football, a dubious distinction that helped them select O. J. Simpson in the NFL Draft.

Looking for other options, Mazur was hired as an assistant with the Boston Patriots on February 6, 1969. However, the team struggled under new head coach Clive Rush, who resigned on November 3, 1970, elevating Mazur to his first and only head coaching role.

Mazur was re-hired at the end of the 1970 NFL season, and selected quarterback Jim Plunkett with the first pick in the 1971 draft. Leading the team to a 6–8 mark that year, which included upsets of the Miami Dolphins, Baltimore Colts and Oakland Raiders, the team enjoyed its best record since 1966, and Mazur was awarded a new contract with a substantial pay increase. That excitement would be short-lived as the Patriots won only two of their first nine games. Mazur then resigned on November 13, 1972, one day after a 52–0 shutout by Miami, and was replaced by Phil Bengtson.

Mazur would resurface the next year as defensive backs coach with the Philadelphia Eagles, and would survive the dismissal of much of the coaching staff following the end of the 1975 NFL season. However, after just one year working under Dick Vermeil, Mazur left in 1977 to join former Eagles assistant Walt Michaels, who had been hired as head coach of the New York Jets.

After two years as defensive backs coach with the Jets, Mazur was promoted to defensive coordinator in 1979, helping the team to its second straight 8–8 season. The following year, the team's fortunes dipped considerably with a 4–12 mark, while Mazur's health also took a turn for the worse. In December, he announced that he would be retiring to battle the effects of Parkinson's disease.

Since his retirement, Mazur's finances dwindled because of his disease, forcing his now 74-year-old wife Bernadine to return to work. In a 2005 Boston Globe article, Mazur, then a resident of Mount Laurel, New Jersey, noted that his $1,500 per month pension had not increased in more than a quarter century.

References

1930 births
2013 deaths
American football quarterbacks
American players of Canadian football
Canadian football quarterbacks
BC Lions players
Boston Patriots (AFL) coaches
Boston Patriots coaches
Boston Patriots head coaches
Boston University Terriers football coaches
Buffalo Bills coaches
Marquette Golden Avalanche football coaches
National Football League defensive coordinators
New York Jets coaches
New England Patriots coaches
New England Patriots head coaches
Notre Dame Fighting Irish football players
Philadelphia Eagles coaches
Quantico Marines Devil Dogs football players
Tulane Green Wave football coaches
People from Plymouth, Pennsylvania
People from Mount Laurel, New Jersey
Coaches of American football from Pennsylvania
Players of American football from Pennsylvania
Boston Patriots (AFL) head coaches